The 2018 Connecticut Senate election was held on November 6, 2018, concurrently with the elections for the Connecticut House of Representatives, to elect members to the Connecticut General Assembly. All 36 seats in the Connecticut Senate were up for election. The election resulted in Democrats expanding control in both chambers of the Connecticut General Assembly, ending the split control in the Senate, that had been in place since the 2016 elections. Primary elections were held on August 14, 2018.

Background

2016 General Election 
In the 2016 Connecticut State Senate election, Democrats lost their 21-15 majority as Republican achieved a net gain of three seats. The resulting 18–18 tie made procedural changes necessary. A power-sharing agreement was reached dividing control of the chamber, splitting the committees 50-50 and giving power to the Republicans to call procedural votes to bring legislation to the chamber floor, while Democratic Lt. Gov. Nancy Wyman retained the ability to break tied votes.

2017 Special Elections 

On January 4, 2017, shortly before the begin of 2017 legislative session, two State Senators resigned in order to pursue other offices. Democratic Senator Eric Coleman and Republican Senator Rob J. Kane resigned to pursue other state offices just minutes before the opening of the session in a deal of the parties which retained the partisan balance of the State Senate.

Coleman was nominated by Governor Dannel Malloy for a judgeship on the Superior Court and was confirmed in May 2018 by the State Senate in a 23–13 vote and the State House in a close 74–72 vote. Opponents of his nomination argued that because of the budget crisis the State could not afford the judges. Rob Kane was appointed as the Republican Auditor of Public Accounts, a post overseeing an agency that exist twice and is a patronage post of both parties in General Assembly. Kane was confirmed by the State House by a voice vote and the State Senate by a 32–1 vote. He serves with Democrat John C. Geragosian. His predecessor Robert Ward had retired in December 2016.

On February 28, 2017, Democratic State Representative Douglas McCrory was elected to Coleman's seat by a 72-25 margin against Republican nominee Michael McDonald while Republican State Representative Eric Berthel was elected to Kane's seat by a 54-44 margin against Democratic nominee Greg Cava. Therefore, the special elections did not alter the partisan makeup of the Senate which remained tied 18-18.

2017 Budget conflict 
On July 1, 2017, Connecticut entered its fiscal year without an enacted budget for the first time since 2009. A government shutdown was avoided by an executive order by Governor Dannel Malloy. The executive order imposed funding cuts to road repairs, school districts and non-profit organizations among other cuts. In June 2017, House and Senate Democrats had been unable to even agree on a provisional budget, while Republicans offered an budget that included savings due to changes to the collective bargaining of state employees. Among Democrats legislators, a liberal faction tried to avoid cuts to social security while a moderate faction tried to avoid tax increases.

At the beginning of July 2017, Connecticut budget deficit was estimated to be around $5.1 billion (equivalent to $ billion in ). After negotiations with state employee union leaders, Governor Malloy announced an agreement that achieved a $1.57 billion (equivalent to $ billion in ) saving while extending the contract's end date to 2027. On July 18, it was announced that the unions' members had approved the agreement by a margin of 83 percent to 17 percent. On July 24, the Connecticut House of Representatives approved the deal by a 78–72 vote, with all Republican Representatives and Democrat John Hampton opposed. On July 31, 2017,  Lt. Gov. Nancy Wyman had to break a 18–18 tie in the Connecticut Senate in favor of the agreement. The approval of the Connecticut General Assembly made it possible for the agreement to take effect in the same fiscal year and not in the next.

On September 15, 2017, three Democratic Senators, Paul Doyle, Joan Hartley and Gayle Slossberg, unexpectedly broke with their caucus and voted in favor of a Republican budget plan, that passed the Connecticut Senate by a 21–15 vote. At around 3 AM on September 16, 2017, the Connecticut House of Representative also passed the Republican proposal by a 77–73 with five Democratic Representatives, John Hampton, Pat Boyd, Lonnie Reed, Daniel S. Rovero and Kim Rose, defecting from their caucus. Governor Malloy vowed to veto the plan because of its cuts to higher education, which he did on September 28, 2017. On October 13, 2017, Standard & Poor's notified the state that it had changed the outlook on its general debt from "stable" to "negative".

On October 18, 2017, Democratic and Republican legislative leaders announced that they had come to an agreement on a two-year budget without input from Governor Malloy. The deal included no increases to the state's income and sales taxes, while increasing a tax for hospital providers from 6% to 8%, increasing the cigarette tax and adding a $10 surcharge for motor vehicle registrations and a $0.25 fee for Uber and Lyft rides. They also agreed upon a $40 million bailout for the city of Hartford, restoring the funding of municipalities and schools, while cutting $65 million in funding for the University of Connecticut and reducing available tax credits. In addition it put caps on spending and borrowing by the state and require the General Assembly to vote on all state employee union contracts, both Republican priorities.

On October 26, 2017, the Connecticut Senate passed the compromise budget by a vote of 33–3, while the Connecticut House of Representatives passed it by a 126–33 vote. On October 31, 2017, Governor Malloy signed most of the budget, while using his line-item veto to block the increase of the hospital provider fee. This hospital tax get reimbursed by federal government through Medicaid funding. According to the Governor, the wording of the budget had flaws which would cause the state to lose around $1 billion on the tax increase. On November 14, 2017, the Connecticut Senate passed a bill supported by Governor Malloy that clarified the wording of the hospital provider fee by a 34–0 vote. The bill also passed the Connecticut House of Representatives on November 15, 2017, by a 123–12 vote.

The budget crisis caused Connecticut to have no budget for 123 days, the longest period without a budget in state history.

Results

Analysis 
Connecticut can be considered a "blue state" that has supported the Democratic nominee for president in every election since 1992 and in which Democrats outnumber Republican by a ratio of 5 to 3 in voter registration. Nevertheless, the 2018 elections for Governor and General Assembly were considered competitive as the budget woes and a struggling economy in the state made incumbent Governor Dan Malloy very unpopular. Polls also showed that President Trump had a low approval rating in the State, which affect down-ballot elections.

Connecticut Democrats were able to capitalize more on the Anti-Trump sentiment than their Republican counterparts could with Anti-Malloy sentiment. In the Connecticut Senate, Democrats were able to win districts in traditionally Republican strongholds by among others flipping multiple legislative seats in Fairfield County. The senate district along Connecticut's Gold Coast (District 36) elected a Democrat for the first time in nearly 90 years.

In the 2018 elections, Democrats saw gains in state elections across the countries, gaining multiple Governorships and legislative chambers. Democrats also won control of the United States House of Representatives for the first time since 2010. Commentators called the election results a "blue wave", that was especially pronounced in state elections.

Overview 

Source: Official results.

By district

District 1 
Incumbent Democratic state senator John Fonfara had represented the Connecticut's 1st State Senate District since 1997. He won reelection against Republican Barbara Ruhe and Green candidate Barbara Barry.

District 2 
Incumbent Democratic state senator Douglas McCrory had represented the Connecticut's 2nd State Senate District since 2017. He won reelection unopposed.

District 3 
Incumbent Democratic state senator Timothy Larson had represented the Connecticut's 3rd State Senate District since 2015. He won reelection against Republican Jennifer L. Lovett, who was also the nominee of the Independent Party of Connecticut.

District 4 
Incumbent Democratic state senator Steve Cassano, who was also the nominee of the Working Families Party, had represented the Connecticut's 4th State Senate District since 2011. He won reelection against Republican State Representative Mark Tweedie, who was also the nominee of the Independent Party of Connecticut.

District 5 
Incumbent Democratic state senator Beth Bye had represented the Connecticut's 5th State Senate District since 2011. She won reelection against Republican Philip Chabot, who was also the nominee of the Independent Party of Connecticut.

District 6 
Incumbent Democratic state senator Terry Gerratana, who was also the nominee of the Working Families Party, had represented the Connecticut's 6th State Senate District since 2011. She won reelection against Republican Robert Medley.

District 7 
Incumbent Republican state senator John Kissel, who was also the nominee of the Independent Party of Connecticut, had represented the Connecticut's 7th State Senate District since 1993. He won reelection against former Democratic State Representative Annie Hornish, who was also the nominee of the Working Families Party.

District 8 
Incumbent Republican state senator Kevin Witkos, who was also the nominee of the Independent Party of Connecticut, had represented the Connecticut's 8th State Senate District since 2009. He won reelection against Democratic nominee Melissa Osborn.

District 9 
Incumbent Democratic state senator Paul Doyle had represented the Connecticut's 9th State Senate District since 2011. He did not run for reelection in 2018. The open seat was won by Democratic State Representative Matt Lesser, who was also the nominee of the Working Families Party, against Republican Ed Charamut.

District 10 
Incumbent Democratic state senator Gary Winfield, who was also the nominee of the Working Families Party, had represented the Connecticut's 10th State Senate District since 2014. He won reelection against Republican Douglas Losty.

District 11 
Incumbent Democratic state senator Martin Looney had represented the Connecticut's 11th State Senate District since 1993. He won reelection against Republican Erin Reilly.

District 12 
Incumbent Democratic state senator Ted Kennedy, Jr. had represented the Connecticut's 12th State Senate District since 2015. He did not run for reelection in 2018. The open seat was won by former Democrat Christine Cohen, who was also the nominee of the Working Families Party, against Republican Adam Greenberg, who was also the nominee of the Independent Party of Connecticut.

District 13 
Incumbent Republican state senator Len Suzio, who was also the nominee of the Independent Party of Connecticut, had represented the Connecticut's 13th State Senate District since 2017. He was defeated for reelection by Democratic nominee Mary Daugherty Abrams, who was also the nominee of the Working Families Party.

District 14 
Incumbent Democratic state senator Gayle Slossberg had represented the Connecticut's 14th State Senate District since 2005. She did not run for reelection in 2018. The open seat was won by former Democratic State Representative James Maroney, who was also the nominee of the Working Families Party, against Republican State Representative Pam Staneski.

District 15 
Incumbent Democratic state senator Joan Hartley had represented the Connecticut's 15th State Senate District since 2001. He won reelection against Independent Party of Connecticut nominee James Russell.

District 16 
Incumbent Republican state senator Joe Markley had represented the Connecticut's 16th State Senate District since 2011. He did not run for reelection in 2018. The open seat was won by Republican Rob Sampson, who was also the nominee of the Independent Party of Connecticut, against Democratic nominee 	Vickie Orsini Nardello, who was also the nominee of the Working Families Party.

District 17 
Incumbent Republican state senator George Logan, who was also the nominee of the Independent Party of Connecticut, had represented the Connecticut's 17th State Senate District since 2017. He won reelection against Democratic nominee Jorge Cabrera, who was also the nominee of the Working Families Party. The apparent winner changed after election night and was decided by a recount.

District 18 
Incumbent Republican state senator Heather Somers, who was also the nominee of the Independent Party of Connecticut, had represented the Connecticut's 18th State Senate District since 2017. She won reelection against Democratic nominee Robert Statchen, who was also the nominee of the Working Families Party. The apparent winner changed after election night and was decided by a recount.

District 19 
Incumbent Democratic state senator Catherine Osten, who was also the nominee of the Working Families Party, had represented the Connecticut's 19th State Senate District since 2011. She won reelection against Republican Mark Lounsbury, who was also the nominee of the Independent Party of Connecticut.

District 20 
Incumbent Republican state senator Paul Formica, who was also the nominee of the Independent Party of Connecticut, had represented the Connecticut's 20th State Senate District since 2015. He won reelection against Democratic nominee Martha Marx, who was also the nominee of the Working Families Party.

District 21 
Incumbent Republican state senator Kevin C. Kelly had represented the Connecticut's 21st State Senate District since 2011. He won reelection against Democratic nominee Monica Tujak Brill.

District 22 
Incumbent Democratic state senator Marilyn Moore, who was also the nominee of the Working Families Party, had represented the Connecticut's 22nd State Senate District since 2011. She won reelection against Republican Rich Deecken, who was also the nominee of the Independent Party of Connecticut.

District 23 
Incumbent Democratic state senator Edwin Gomes had represented the Connecticut's 23rd State Senate District since 2015. He did not run for reelection in 2018. The open seat was won by Democratic nominee Dennis Bradley against Republican John Rodriguez.

District 24 
Incumbent Republican state senator Michael McLachlan, who was also the nominee of the Independent Party of Connecticut, had represented the Connecticut's 24th State Senate District since 2009. He was defeated for reelection by Democratic nominee Julie Kushner, who was also the nominee of the Working Families Party.

District 25 
Incumbent Democratic state senator Bob Duff, who was also the nominee of the Working Families Party, had represented the Connecticut's 25th State Senate District since 2005. He won reelection against Republican Mark Marc D'Amelio, who was also the nominee of the Independent Party of Connecticut.

District 26 
Incumbent Republican state senator Toni Boucher, who was also the nominee of the Independent Party of Connecticut, had represented the Connecticut's 26th State Senate District since 2009. She was defeated for reelection by Democratic nominee Will Haskell.

District 27 
Incumbent Democratic state senator Carlo Leone had represented the Connecticut's 27th State Senate District since 2011. He won reelection against Republican Jerry Bosak, who was also the nominee of the Independent Party of Connecticut, and Green candidate Cora Santaguida.

District 28 
Incumbent Republican state senator Tony Hwang, who was also the nominee of the Independent Party of Connecticut, had represented the Connecticut's 28th State Senate District since 2015. He won reelection against Democratic nominee Michelle Lapine McCabe, who was also the nominee of the Working Families Party.

District 29 
Incumbent Democratic state senator Mae Flexer, who was also the nominee of the Working Families Party, had represented the Connecticut's 29th State Senate District since 2011. He won reelection against Republican David Coderre, who was also the nominee of the Independent Party of Connecticut.

District 30 
Incumbent Republican state senator Craig Miner, who was also the nominee of the Independent Party of Connecticut, had represented the Connecticut's 30th State Senate District since 2017. He won reelection against Democratic nominee David Lawson, who was also the nominee of the Working Families Party. The apparent winner changed after election night and was decided by a recount.

District 31 
Incumbent Republican state senator Henri Martin, who was also the nominee of the Independent Party of Connecticut, had represented the Connecticut's 31st State Senate District since 2015. He won reelection against Democratic nominee Christopher Wright.

District 32 
Incumbent Republican state senator Eric Berthel had represented the Connecticut's 32nd State Senate District since 2017. He won reelection against Democratic nominee Catherine De Carli.

District 33 
Incumbent Republican state senator Art Linares had represented the Connecticut's 33rd State Senate District since 2013. He did not run for reelection in 2018. The open seat was won by Democratic nominee Norm Needleman against Republican Melissa Ziobron, who was also the nominee of the Independent Party of Connecticut.

District 34 
Incumbent Republican state senator Len Fasano, who was also the nominee of the Independent Party of Connecticut, had represented the Connecticut's 34th State Senate District since 2003. He won reelection against Democratic nominee Aili McKeen.

District 35 
Incumbent Republican state senator Tony Guglielmo had represented the Connecticut's 35th State Senate District since 1993. He did not run for reelection in 2018. The open seat was won by Republican Dan Champagne against Democrat John Perrier, who was also the nominee of the Working Families Party and the Independent Party of Connecticut.

District 36 
Incumbent Republican state senator Scott Frantz, who was also the nominee of the Independent Party of Connecticut, had represented the Connecticut's 36th State Senate District since 2009. He was defeated for reelection by Democratic nominee Alexandra Kasser.

Aftermath

Reactions 
The Hartford Courier called the results a "growing rout for Republicans in Connecticut".  Democratic Senate President Martin Looney called the election a "big night for Democrats". Looney also saw the "Trump factor" as a reason for the Democrats' success. Governor Malloy commented the results saying that Connecticut voters "unequivocally rejected the hateful politics and backwards policies espoused by the Trump administration and national Republicans."

After the election, several Republicans criticized the state party's strategy and field operations during the 2018 state elections. Danbury Mayor Mark Boughton, who finished second in the 2018 Republican primary for governor, criticized the unwillingness of state Republicans to distance themselves from President Trump, who was unpopular in the state. He said: "We let Trump take over this race. It became a referendum on Trump and you’re not going win that way."

Recounts 
In the 17th State Senate district, after election night results showing State Senator George Logan trailing his Democratic challenger Jorge Cabrera by over 200 votes. After reporting mistakes in Ansonia were corrected showing Logan lead the race by 65 votes. The recount increased the margin of victory to 85 votes. Democrats considered further legal actions but chose not pursue them, after Cabrera conceded to Logan on November 14, 2018.

In the 33rd State Senate district, election night results showed Democrat Norman Needleman beating by 303 votes, outside of the automatic recount margin. According to state law, an automatic recount is required if the margin of victory is smaller than 0.5% or less than 20 votes. The Essex Registrar of Voters had reported incorrect returns to the Secretary of State's office. The corrected results showed Norman Needleman leading by just 137 votes, triggering an automatic recount. The recount did not change the result but further reduced the margin of victory to 85 votes.

2019 Legislative Session 

Three Democratic State Senators, Tim Larson, Beth Bye and Terry Gerratana, resigned on January 8, 2019, in order to join newly elected Governor Ned Lamont's administration. These resignation reduced the Democratic majority to 20–13. According to state law, a special election must be conducted to fill the vacant seats. The governor must call for an election no later than 10 days after the vacancy happens. All special elections must be held no later than 46 days after a governor's declaration. The special elections were held on February 26, 2019. Democrats Saud Anwar and Derek Slap won the 3rd and 5th State Senate district respectively, while Republican Gennaro Bizzarro flipped the 6th State Senate district. The special elections thus resulted in a 22-14 Democratic majority.

On January 9, 2019, 33 Senators and 149 State Representatives were sworn in as members of the Connecticut General Assembly. The newly elected General Assembly was sworn in with the most female members of all time.

References 

State Senate
2018
Connecticut